Captain Courtesy is a lost 1915 American silent drama film directed by Phillips Smalley and Lois Weber based upon a novel by Edward Childs Carpenter. The film stars Dustin Farnum, Courtenay Foote, Winifred Kingston, Herbert Standing, and Jack Hoxie. The film was released on April 19, 1915, by Paramount Pictures.

Plot
Set against the events surrounding the formation of the California Republic on June 14, 1846 and its occupation by United States forces on July 9, 1846, Dustin Farnum plays the son of American settlers of Alta California who when he was a young boy were killed by the Mexicans, upon whom he has vowed revenge. Now a young man, he invents the persona of "Captain Courtesy," a mysterious masked defender of Americans' rights in the Alta California territory.  An American-style Robin Hood, he robs wealthy Mexicans and gives the plunder to his fellow Americans. Courtenay Foote plays a renegade American spying for the Mexicans who encounters Captain Courtesy at a mission and informs the Mexican authorities, who dispatch military troops to capture him. Captain Courtesy rides out of the mission, encounters a troop of American cavalrymen, and leads them back to the mission in time to liberate the local Americans. He learns that the American spy was responsible for his parents' death, but the woman he loves stops him from exacting revenge.

The pictured 1915 advertisement in Variety (which erroneously lists the author as "Edward Charles Carpenter), subtitled "A romantic story of the Mexican occupation of California, 1840-1846", depicts a man clad in buckskins and promises "red blooded action, ardent love making, excellent photography from start to finish."

Cast 
Dustin Farnum as Leonardo Davis
Courtenay Foote as George Granville
Winifred Kingston as Eleanor
Herbert Standing as Father Reinaldo
Jack Hoxie as Martinez 
Carl von Schiller as Jocoso
Winona Brown as Indian Girl Servant

References

External links 
 
 
 Lantern slide

1915 films
1910s English-language films
Silent American drama films
1915 drama films
Paramount Pictures films
Films directed by Lois Weber
American black-and-white films
American silent feature films
Lost American films
1915 lost films
Lost drama films
1910s American films